Mauricio Toni (born 9 March 1998) is an Argentine-Croatian professional footballer who plays as a defender.

Club career
CAI, River Plate and Vélez Sarsfield were youth teams of Toni. The latter became Toni's first senior club in 2017. He made his professional bow in the Argentine Primera División during 2016–17, appearing in the second half of a 0–3 defeat of Tigre on 3 June 2017. Toni completed a season-long loan move to Talleres in August 2018. Just two appearances followed. July 2019 saw Toni loaned to Primera B Nacional with Alvarado. However, the defender ended his stay there in the succeeding January after not appearing competitively. A further loan move to Deportivo Armenio was soon completed.

Toni participated in eight Primera B Metropolitana matches for Armenio, prior to returning to his parent club midway through 2020. 

On 21 February 2021, Toni got his contract with Vélez Sarsfield terminated by mutual agreement.

International career
Toni previously received a call-up to Croatia's U21s.

Career statistics
.

References

External links

1998 births
Living people
People from Comodoro Rivadavia
Argentine footballers
Association football defenders
Argentine Primera División players
Primera B Metropolitana players
Club Atlético Vélez Sarsfield footballers
Talleres de Córdoba footballers
Club Atlético Alvarado players
Deportivo Armenio footballers